Payne is an unincorporated community in Meadowlands Township, Saint Louis County, Minnesota, United States.

Geography
Payne is located in the northeast corner of Meadowlands Township. The community is located at the intersection of Saint Louis County Highway 7 (CR 7) and County Road 232 (Lake Nichols Road). Saint Louis County Highway 133 (CR 133) is nearby.

History
A post office called Payne was established in 1904, and remained in operation until 1972. The community was named for a railroad official.

References

 Official State of Minnesota Highway Map – 2011/2012 edition

Unincorporated communities in Minnesota
Unincorporated communities in St. Louis County, Minnesota